Credito Artigiano was an Italian bank based in Milan, Lombardy. it was absorbed by Credito Valtellinese in 2012.

History
Credito Artigiano was found in Milan in 1946. Since 1995 it was a subsidiary of Credito Valtellinese (Creval). In 1999 it was listed in Borsa Italiana. In 1999 Creval owned 54.01% shares of Credito Artigiano. In 2000 Credito Artigiano acquired 51% shares of Banca dell'Artigianato e dell'Industria and 76.94% stake of Banca Regionale Sant'Angelo (ex-Nuova Banca del Monte Sant'Agata) in 2001. In 2002 Credito Valtellinese increased its ownership on the bank to 63.34% (buying 5% from Cattolica Assicurazioni). It was increased to 65.04% in 2003, 65.50% in 2004, 65.72% in 2005, 69.82% in 2008, 69.85% in 2009, 69.88% in 2010, 72.14% in 2011.

Credito Artigiano jointed-control Credito Siciliano with the parent company Creval when the subsidiary was created in 2002 .

On 10 September 2012 Credito Artigiano was incorporated into Credito Valtellinese.

References

External links

 Entry  in Borsa Italiana 

Banks established in 1946
Italian companies established in 1946
Banks disestablished in 2012
Italian companies disestablished in 2012
Defunct banks of Italy
Companies based in Milan
Credito Valtellinese
Companies formerly listed on the Borsa Italiana